The 1940–41 Coppa Italia was the 8th Coppa Italia, the major Italian domestic cup. The competition was won by Venezia.

Serie C elimination round 

Replay matches

First round 
6 clubs are added (Monfalcone, Ilva Savona, Carpi, Battipaglia, Juventina Palermo, Messina).

Replay matches

Second round

Serie B elimination round

Third round 
16 Serie B clubs are added (Modena, Anconitana-Bianchi, Brescia, Alessandria, Fanfulla, Lucchese, Hellas Verona, Vicenza, Macerata, Siena, Padova, Udinese, Savona, Spezia, Pisa, Liguria).

Round of 32 
16 Serie A clubs are added (Ambrosiana-Inter, Juventus, Atalanta, Milano, Fiorentina, Genova 1893, Livorno, Roma, Torino, Napoli, Triestina, Lazio, Venezia, Bologna, Bari, Novara).

Replay matches

Round of 16 

Replay match

Quarter-finals

Semi-finals

Replay match

Final

First leg

Second leg 

Venezia won 4–3 on aggregate.

Top goalscorers

References

External links
rsssf.com
 http://www.almanaccogiallorosso.it/1940-1941/CoppaItalia/Finale-Andata/Roma-Venezia.html

Coppa Italia seasons
1940–41 domestic association football cups
Coppa